Johnny "Chuck" Weatherspoon, Jr. (born July 31, 1968) is a former American football running back who played one season with the Tampa Bay Buccaneers of the National Football League (NFL). He was drafted by the Philadelphia Eagles in the ninth round of the 1991 NFL Draft. Weatherspoon played college football at the University of Houston. He was also a member of the Fort Worth Cavalry of the Arena Football League (AFL).

Early years and college career
Weatherspoon attended La Habra High School in La Habra, California.

He played for the Houston Cougars of the University of Houston from 1987 to 1990. He recorded career totals of 3,247 yards and 27 touchdowns on 395 rushing attempts. He also accumulated 1,375 yards and eight touchdowns on 117 receptions. Weatherspoon led NCAA Division I-A in rushing yards per attempt in 1988 with an 8.5 average and again led Division I-A with a 9.6 average in 1989.  His career average of 8.2 yards per carry is tied with Darrell Henderson of Memphis as the best in college football history.

Professional career
Weatherspoon was selected by the Philadelphia Eagles of the NFL with the 242nd pick in the 1991 NFL Draft.  He was subsequently signed as a free agent by the Tampa Bay Buccaneers and played in four games for the team during the 1991 season. He played for the Fort Worth Cavalry of the AFL in 1994.

See also
 List of college football yearly rushing leaders

References

External links
Just Sports Stats
College stats

Living people
1968 births
Players of American football from Georgia (U.S. state)
American football running backs
African-American players of American football
Houston Cougars football players
Tampa Bay Buccaneers players
Fort Worth Cavalry players
People from Hinesville, Georgia
21st-century African-American people
20th-century African-American sportspeople